The Optare Esteem was a low-floor single-decker bus body manufactured by East Lancashire Coachbuilders, Darwen East Lancs and Optare between 2006 and 2009 on Scania N94UB, Scania N230UB, Volvo B7RLE, MAN 12.240, Alexander Dennis Dart SLF, Alexander Dennis Enviro200 Dart and Alexander Dennis Enviro300 chassis.

History

The Esteem was launched by East Lancashire Coachbuilders in 2006. The first production examples entered service with Preston Bus in September 2006 on Scania N94UB chassis.

After East Lancashire Coachbuilders was placed in administration in August 2007, it was bought by Darwen Group and the Esteem was rebranded as the Darwen Esteen. In 2008, Darwen Group merged its Darwen East Lancs and Optare businesses under the latter name, resulting in the Esteem being rebranded again.

The first few examples of the Esteem only had new front and rear ends, the sides still being of the older Myllennium design. There were also two double-decker variants of this body - the Olympus that was a closed top double-decker and the Visionaire that was an open top double-decker.

Production of the Optare Esteem ceased in 2009, with the last being 40 built on Alexander Dennis Enviro200 Dart chassis for Go-Ahead London.

Panaire 
It was also planned for an open top version of the Esteem to be launched alongside, named the Panaire. This version of the bus never attracted any orders and was removed from the product list during the reverse takeover.

Customers 
Metrobus had the largest number of the original East Lancs Esteems, some of which were on Scania N94UB, Scania N230UB and MAN 12.240 chassis while 21 on Alexander Dennis Dart SLF chassis were purchased for Transport for London contracted routes. The first two Esteems to be built on the Alexander Dennis Enviro300 chassis were delivered to Courtney Coaches in 2006, and were the first Enviro300s with bodywork not built by Alexander Dennis.

References

External links

Esteem brochure East Lancashire Coachbuilders
Esteem product information Optare

Esteem
Esteem
Buses of the United Kingdom
Low-floor buses
Full-size buses
Midibuses
Vehicles introduced in 2006